Roncaro is a comune (municipality) in the Province of Pavia in the Italian region Lombardy, located about 30 km southeast of Milan and about 12 km northeast of Pavia.

Roncaro borders the following municipalities: Cura Carpignano, Lardirago, Marzano, Sant'Alessio con Vialone, Vistarino.

References

Cities and towns in Lombardy